Aerangis flexuosa is a species of  epiphytic orchid endemic to the island of São Tomé.

References

Epiphytic orchids
Plants described in 1918
Endemic flora of São Tomé and Príncipe
flexuosa